The 2017 Fast5 Netball World Series was the eighth staging of the annual Fast5 Netball World Series, and the fifth to be played under the new Fast5 rules, which replaced the older fastnet rules introduced in 2009. The tournament was held in Australia for the second time with the venue being at Hisense Arena in Melbourne.

The 2017 tournament was contested by the same six teams that competed last year.

Overview

Date and Venue
The 2017 Fast5 Netball World Series was played in Melbourne, Australia over two days, from 28–29 October. All matches were held at Hisense Arena, which has a capacity of 10,500.

Format
18 matches were played over two days, under the Fast5 rules of netball. Each team played each other once during the first two days in a round-robin format. The two highest-scoring teams from this stage progressed to the Grand Final while the remaining teams contested the third-fourth place playoff match and fifth-sixth place playoff match.

Teams
The tournament is being contested by the six top national netball teams in the world, according to the INF World Rankings:

Draw and results

Standings

Final Placings

|

References
Official Link

2017
2017 in netball
International netball competitions hosted by Australia
2017 in Australian netball
2017 in New Zealand netball
2017 in English netball
2017 in South African women's sport
2017 in Malawian sport
2017 in Jamaican sport
Netball in Victoria (Australia)